Paintball pistols are a type of paintball marker used in paintball, which loosely resemble pistols. There are two main types of pistols: pump and semi-automatic.

Uses of a pistol and basic use

Speedball
Paintball pistols are not used in tournament level speedball games. Due to one marker per person rules, a player may not carry two markers onto the field. A pistol has a lower shot capacity, leaving the player at a severe disadvantage against an opponent. Sometimes in recreational settings a player will agree to play with a pistol to put themselves at a severe disadvantage to attempt to prove superior skill over an opponent. Playing in such a situation has many similarities to stock paintball.
Despite these apparent disadvantages there are a growing number of players who choose to play with a pistol as their primary marker.

Scenario
Paintball pistols are primarily used as a sidearm. The use of a paintball pistol is often as a last resort situation. In scenario games often drivers of paintball tanks will utilize a paintball pistol as a backup marker.

Some players use them as their primary weapons.

Bush
Paintball pistols are often used as sidearms. Some players have learned diversionary tactics with pistols, pretending to fumble or reload the main marker, only to pull up a close range shot with a pistol. Many players find this kind of action unsportsmanlike, and some fields ban the use of sidearms.

Manufacturers
Paintball pistols are manufactured by a number of companies in a few main calibers.  The three calibers are 11mm/.43 cal, .50 cal, and .68 cal .  The main manufacturers of paintball pistols are Tippmann, Tiberius Arms (now called First Strike), and Kingman.  The price points on the pistols range from approximately $100–$400.
Walther, the gun manufacturer based in Germany, also makes .43 caliber paintball pistol replicas of a few of its real pistols as training tools for police forces. These paintball markers are built to match the weight, action, and feel of the real gun. These markers have the designation "RAM" which stands for "real action marker", which means they match the real pistol they represent in the slide action, recoil, safety mechanism, and of course weight.

Accessories 
Many accessories are available for paintball pistols including holsters, mock silencers, scopes, flashlights, laser lights, and high performance part kits.

Another new development from paintball manufacturers is First Strike Rounds.  First strike rounds are designed to replace the .68 caliber paintball and are being introduced into the market.  They can be very useful in paintball pistols where accuracy can be an issue.  The advantage to using first strike rounds is their uniform shape.  Most regular paint balls can easily become malformed causing the paintball to veer off course and resulting in numerous misses.   When you only have a few rounds as is the case with paintball pistols this can end up in your elimination from the game.  First Strike Rounds allow consistency and accuracy even in pistols.

Pros and Cons 
As compared to a standard paintball marker:

Pros 
Extremely light
Can be carried in holster or in a harness
Smaller profile / no hopper
More maneuverable / portable
Can be a back-up to main "weapon"
Less exposure while blind firing (a practice banned on most fields)
Easier reload
Lesser jam frequency
Quick change of the tank or rubber grips

Cons 
Smaller ammunition capacity
Smaller air capacity (usually 12 gram CO2 powerlets to fire 20-50 shots, sometimes 3–4 oz tanks)
Specialty equipment needed to carry the smaller tubes/magazines and CO2 powerlets.

See also
List of Paintball Pistols.

References

Paintball equipment